Maniatikos, is a local Greek folk dance from Mani, Greece, with a  rhythm meter.

See also
Music of Greece
Greek dances

References
Ελληνικοί παραδοσιακοί χοροί: Μανιάτικος (article in Greek)

Greek dances